Miniport is a type of device driver in Microsoft Windows that implements hardware-specific or function-specific subset of the full driver stack. Examples include:
 NDIS Miniport
 WDM Miniport
 Display Miniport
 Audio Miniport
 StorPort Miniport
 WIA Minidriver
 HID Minidriver
 Bluetooth Protocol Driver

References